Noureddine Daham (born 15 November 1977 in Oran) is an Algerian footballer who currently plays for ASO Chlef in the Algerian Ligue Professionnelle 1.

International career
Daham made his debut for the Algerian national team in 2006 when he was called up by then head coach Meziane Ighil for a friendly against Burkina Faso. He scored his first goal for the team in the second game, a friendly against Sudan. He has been a regular for the team since his first call-up.

Club career
Daham began his playing career with his hometown team ASM Oran. After five seasons with them, he joined JS Kabylie in the summer of 2002. He was released from the club after an incident in France in which he was accused of stealing from a store. In 2004, he joined MC Alger where he enjoyed his most successful time. He helped them win the Algerian Cup in 2006 with two goals in the final against USM Alger. He is also their all-time top scorer in the Arab Champions League with six goals. In summer of the same year, he joined as a waiver recently relegated 1. FC Kaiserslautern in the 2. Bundesliga. Just three weeks into season 2007–08, the often-injured Daham was transferred to TuS Koblenz.

Honours
MC Alger
 Algerian Cup: 2006

USM Alger
 Algerian Cup: 2012–13
 UAFA Club Cup: 2012–13

References

External links
 
 

1977 births
Living people
Algerian footballers
Algeria international footballers
1. FC Kaiserslautern players
TuS Koblenz players
Expatriate footballers in Germany
JS Kabylie players
USM Alger players
Footballers from Oran
MC Alger players
ASM Oran players
ASO Chlef players
Algerian expatriates in Germany
Algerian Ligue Professionnelle 1 players
2. Bundesliga players
Association football forwards
21st-century Algerian people